Boxee Box by D-Link (officially "D-Link Boxee Box DSM-380") is a Linux-based set-top device and media extender that first began shipping in 33 countries worldwide on 10 November 2010. Designed to easily bring Internet television and other video to the television via Boxee's software, it comes pre-installed with Boxee media center software. The DM-380 features an HDMI port (version 1.3), optical digital audio (S/PDIF) out, an RCA connector for analog stereo audio, two USB ports, an SD card slot, wired 100BASE-TX Ethernet, and built-in 2.4 GHz 802.11n WiFi. The Live TV dongle, which started shipping in February 2012, enables users to watch digital OTA or Clear QAM cable television channels with EPG. 

The Boxee Box also ships with a small two-sided RF remote control with four-way D-pad navigation and a full QWERTY keypad as standard. This remote was also being sold separately with a USB receiver as "D-Link Boxee Box Remote DSM-22" that can be used with Boxee installed on a computer (so that one can use this remote without owning D-Link's Boxee Box). The look of both the case and remote prototypes for the Boxee Box was designed by San Francisco-based Astro Studios, the designer of the Xbox 360 and Microsoft Zune.

On 16 October 2012, the Boxee team announced intention to discontinue distribution.

See also
Boxee
D-Link
Comparison of digital media players
FuboTV

References

D-Link
Linux
Computer-related introductions in 2010